Emil Wikström (13 April 1864 in Turku – 26 September 1942 Helsinki) was a Finnish sculptor. Among his best known works are the Lyhdynkantajat ("Lantern Carriers") sculptures on the front of the Helsinki Central railway station and the monuments to Elias Lönnrot and Johan Vilhelm Snellman.

Career

His parents were construction foreman Johan Erik Wikström and Gustava Samuelintytär Linnamäki. Emil Wikström studied art in Finnish Art Association's drawing school in Turku and Helsinki, in the Academy of Fine Arts in Vienna and also in Académie Julian in Paris. Wikström as well as other artists took inspiration for their art from their own country's cultural mythology. Finnish artists studied and worked in Paris. Some decided to retreat to the peace of forest, as Wikström wrote in a letter to Axel Gallén in 1898. Wikström was the first to carry out his plan and he found ideal place for himself in Sääksmäki by Vanajavesi.

Emil Wikström was the one of the most important Finnish sculptors of his time. Best remembered for his public monuments in Helsinki, the statues in railway station, and other cities across Finland, Wikström produced portraits of many statesmen, politicians, businessmen, family and friends, as well as figures from Finnish mythology.

He is buried in the Hietaniemi Cemetery in Helsinki.

Visavuori was opened to the public as a museum in 1967. There many of the original casts and studies are on display.

Personal life

In 1890 he got engaged to painter Dora Wahlroos and they studied arts at Paris together. However they drifted apart and in 1895 Wikström married Alice Högström (1863–1950). They had three daughters: Estelle, Anna-Liisa and Mielikki Anne-Marie. Estelle's son Kari Suomalainen was a famous cartoonist, and her daughter Saskia ( Maaria Eira) was an opera singer and director.

Works

See also
Golden Age of Finnish Art
Finnish art

Notes

References

External links
 Visavuori official website

1864 births
1942 deaths
People from Turku
Academy of Fine Arts Vienna alumni
20th-century Finnish sculptors
19th-century Finnish sculptors
Burials at Hietaniemi Cemetery